The Harbin H-7 bomber was a Chinese military aircraft proposed by Harbin Aircraft Manufacturing Corporation in 1965 and a possible successor to the two-engine Harbin H-5 jet bomber. The project was canceled in early 1970s before the bomber went into production.

References

Cancelled military aircraft projects of China